Nikola "Koca" Marković (1762 – 1832) was a Serbian trader, representative of Prince Miloš Obrenović, and politician. He was Prince Miloš's most influential advisor during the most critical time of the Second Serbian Uprising in 1815.

References

1795 births
1836 deaths
Politicians from Požarevac
People of the First Serbian Uprising
Prime Ministers of Serbia
Finance ministers of Serbia
19th-century Serbian people
Burials in Požarevac
Burials at Serbian Orthodox monasteries and churches
Serbian businesspeople